Yvonne Ní Laife, Irish actress, plays the character Úna Ní Riain on the Irish language drama, Ros na Rún. She has played the part since 2005, following work in Graffiti Theatre Company. She acted multiple parts at An Taibhdhearc, and was employed as a weather presenter on TG4.

References

External links
 https://web.archive.org/web/20090830012902/http://r0snarun.com:80/index.php?option=com_content&task=view&id=40&Itemid=61

Irish stage actresses
Irish television actresses
People from County Galway
Year of birth missing (living people)
Living people
20th-century Irish people
21st-century Irish people